LOGSPEED CZ Aréna is an indoor sporting arena located in Pilsen, Czech Republic. The capacity of the arena is 8,236 people and it was built in 1969. It is currently home to the HC Škoda Plzeň ice hockey team.

References

External links
Official website 

Indoor ice hockey venues in the Czech Republic
Sports venues in Plzeň
1950 establishments in Czechoslovakia
Sports venues completed in 1950
20th-century architecture in the Czech Republic